Hyalostylus is a genus of sponges belonging to the family Euplectellidae.

The species of this genus are found in Pacific Ocean.

Species:

Hyalostylus dives 
Hyalostylus microfloricomus 
Hyalostylus monomicrosclerus 
Hyalostylus schulzei

References

Sponges